Alfonsina  (English language:Alexandra) is a 1957  Argentine biographical film directed by Kurt Land and written by José María Fernández Unsáin. The film stars Amelia Bence as the poet Alfonsina Storni and actor Guillermo Murray.

Plot
The film opens with a wide shot of waves breaking ominously on the seashore, accompanied by Alfonsina's poetry. Another scene has Alfonsina looking into a fish-bowl and saying "I wonder what it would be like to live under the sea".

There is also an important scene where Alfonsina announces the news of her illness performed in a very different way from a Hollywood film.

Cast
 Amelia Bence as  Alfonsina Storni
 Alberto Berco
 José De Angelis
 Dorita Ferreyro
 Domingo Mania
 Alejandro Rey
 Marcela Sola

Production
Amelia Bence stars as the Argentine poet and journalist Alfonsina Storni was an Argentine poet and journalist who made a successful career in the rough macho world of reporting.

Kurt Land was originally from Vienna, so he has a romantic atmosphere somewhat similar to Ernst Lubitsch. This style of movie-making was dated even in 1957, but Alfonsina shows style in the voice over editing of the poetry reading.

Release
The film premiered in 1957.  It was one of the first and few Argentine films shot in widescreen CinemaScope in the 1950s and 60's.

References

External links
 

1957 films
1950s Spanish-language films
Argentine black-and-white films
Argentine biographical films
Films directed by Kurt Land
1950s biographical films
1950s Argentine films